The archery competitions at the 2019 Southeast Asian Games in the Philippines were held from 5 to 9 December 2019 at Clark Parade Grounds in Mabalacat, Philippines.

Medal table

Medalists

Recurve

Compound

References

External links